The Grinch is a fictional character created by Dr. Seuss. He is best known as the main character of the 1957 children's book How the Grinch Stole Christmas! He has been portrayed and voiced by many different actors, including Boris Karloff, Hans Conried, Bob Holt, Anthony Asbury, Jim Carrey, Rik Mayall, Benedict Cumberbatch, Matthew Morrison and David Howard Thornton.

Character description
The Grinch is depicted as a green, pot-bellied, furry, pear-shaped, snub-nosed creature with a cat-like face and cynical personality. In full-color adaptations, he is typically colored yellow green. He has spent the past 53 years living in seclusion on a cliff, overlooking the town of Whoville.

In contrast to the cheerful Whos, the Grinch is misanthropic, ill-natured, and mean-tempered. The reason for this is a source of speculation; the consensus among the Whos is that he was born with a heart that they say was "two sizes too small". Though always hateful, he especially hates the Christmas season, making particular note of how disturbing the various noises of Christmas time are to him, including the singing of Christmas carols. Unable to stand the holiday any longer, he decides to destroy it once and for all.

Aided by his pet dog, Max, he meticulously designs a red suit to disguise himself as Santa Claus and breaks into the Whos' homes on Christmas Eve while they sleep to steal everything they own, right down to the last crumb of food they have, and dump it off of a nearby mountain. Although he pulls off the theft successfully, on Christmas morning, he is shocked to hear the Whos still singing cheerfully, happy simply to have each other. He then realizes that the holiday has a deeper meaning that he never considered. Inspired, he stops the Whos' belongings from falling off the edge of the mountain, and in the process, his heart grows "three sizes". He returns all the gifts he stole and gladly takes part in the Whos' Christmas celebration.

The Grinch is still portrayed as a bitter and ill-tempered character in artwork or other media. In both the animated TV special and the 2000 live-action film, he is shown to have superhuman strength when he stops an entire sleigh loaded with presents from going over a cliff and lifts it over his head, and he is also described as "[finding] the strength of ten Grinches plus two" during that moment of crisis. In the 2018 film, the Grinch has assistance saving all the Whos' stolen goods.

With the character's anti-Christmas spirit followed by the transformation on Christmas morning, scholars have noted similarity to Ebenezer Scrooge from Charles Dickens' 1843 novella A Christmas Carol. Cardiologist David Kass suggested that the rapid growth of the Grinch's heart at the end of the story indicates that the Grinch has the physiology of a Burmese python.

In Seuss's book, "no one quite knows the reason" for the Grinch's grudge. In contrast, the 2000 film adaptation provides a backstory in his upbringing: abandoned in infancy in Whoville and left in the cold, unnoticed by the revelers at a Christmas party, the Grinch is taken in by two Who women. He proves an unruly schoolboy and is bullied by a schoolmate, Augustus May Who (later Whoville's mayor), but falls for a Who-girl named Martha May Whovier. Determined to impress her, he uses various family heirlooms to make an angel Christmas tree-topper for a Christmas gift exchange and vainly attempts to shave, then is mocked for his efforts by all at school but Martha and so conceives an abiding resentment. The TV special The Grinch Grinches the Cat in the Hat lays much of the blame on the absence of the Grinch's mother, who had been a positive, nurturing influence on the Grinch in her lifetime but died some time prior; when the Grinch is finally provoked to grieve at the end of that special, he returns to being good.

History

The first use of the word 'Grinch' in a work by Dr. Seuss appears in the 1953 book Scrambled Eggs Super! (one of the books withdrawn from circulation by the Seuss estate in 2021) about Peter T. Hooper, a boy who collects eggs from a number of exotic birds to make scrambled eggs. One of these exotic birds is the "Beagle-Beaked-Bald-Headed Grinch" who shares the later Grinch's cantankerous attitude.

The name later appeared in the May 1955 issue of Redbook in a 32-line poem called, "The Hoobub and the Grinch". This version bears virtually no resemblance to the later character other than name, instead being a fast-talking salesman in the vein of Sylvester McMonkey McBean from The Sneetches and the Once-ler from Seuss's later book The Lorax. "The Hoobub and the Grinch" would be republished as part of the posthumous anthology Horton and the Kwuggerbug and More Lost Stories in 2014, in which the illustration draws this Grinch far differently.

The Grinch, in his best known incarnation, made his book debut in the 1957 story How the Grinch Stole Christmas, written and illustrated by Dr. Seuss, published as both a Random House book and in an issue of Redbook magazine. In 1966, the story was adapted into an animated television featurette of the same name, which was directed by Chuck Jones and included the song "You're a Mean One, Mr. Grinch". Boris Karloff serves as both the story's narrator and the voice of the Grinch, but the song was sung by Thurl Ravenscroft, as Karloff could not sing.

In 1977, Seuss responded to the fan request for more Grinch tales by writing Halloween Is Grinch Night. The Grinch is voiced by Hans Conried. This was followed in 1982, when Marvel green-lit The Grinch Grinches the Cat in the Hat, a TV film co-starring the Cat in the Hat. The Grinch is voiced by Bob Holt. The special was produced by Dr. Seuss (though under his real name, Ted Geisel). Although not as successful as the original, the two films both received Emmy Awards.

Several episodes of the 1996 Nick Jr. television show The Wubbulous World of Dr. Seuss feature the Grinch as the main antagonist, this time in puppet form. He was performed and voiced by Anthony Asbury from Season 1 (1996) to Season 2 (1998).

A 2000 live-action feature musical comedy film based on the story, directed by Ron Howard and starring Jim Carrey as the Grinch, was a major success at the box office. A video game based on the film, simply entitled The Grinch, was released on several consoles and PC in the same year. It was followed in 2007 by the release of the Nintendo DS title Dr. Seuss: How the Grinch Stole Christmas!.

The Grinch was portrayed on the stage when the story was turned into a 1994 musical by the Children's Theater Company out of Minneapolis. The show made it to Broadway by way of a limited run in 2006. Icelandic actor Stefán Karl Stefánsson portrayed the Grinch in the touring production of the musical from 2008 to 2015. The Grinch is also a minor character in the 2000 musical Seussical, which is based on multiple Seuss works.

The Grinch's story was adapted for a 2018 animated film by Illumination Entertainment, starring Benedict Cumberbatch as the title character.

On Wednesday, December 9, 2020, NBC aired the holiday live production, Dr. Seuss' The Grinch Musical Live! based on the Broadway stage musical. Booboo Stewart plays young Max, Amelia Minto plays Cindy Lou Who, Denis O'Hare plays old Max and Matthew Morrison stars as the Grinch. The musical includes songs from the original musical, such as "You're a Mean One, Mr. Grinch".

In 2022, XYZ Films produced a horror film interpretation, starring David Howard Thornton as the "Mean One", a spoof of the Grinch character.

Voice actors and portrayals

In many different movies, specials, and television series, the Grinch has been voiced and played by many different characters throughout many films. In Chuck Jones' 1966 television special, the Grinch was voiced by Boris Karloff before he died three years later in 1969. Hans Conried voiced the character in Halloween Is Grinch Night while Bob Holt voiced the character in The Grinch Grinches the Cat in the Hat, a crossover with one of Dr. Seuss' characters The Cat in the Hat.

In an episode of Tiny Toon Adventures, a parody of the Grinch was voiced by Homer Simpson's voice actor Dan Castellaneta. Castellaneta would later work on another Dr. Seuss project in 2003's The Cat in the Hat as the voice of Thing One and Two. Walter Matthau voiced the character in Random House Home Video, a few years before his death. The Wubbulous World of Dr. Seuss also features the Grinch, where he was played by puppeteer Anthony Asbury. In Family Guy, the Grinch appeared as a cameo, being voiced by Wally Wingert.

The Grinch was voiced by Corey Burton in Seuss Landing and Sneech Beach Area. In Ron Howard's 2000 How the Grinch Stole Christmas film, the Grinch's first live-action feature, he was played by Jim Carrey. Despite the film having mixed reviews, Carrey's performance as the Grinch was praised by critics. In The Grinch video game, he was voiced by Josh Gerhardt. Late actor Stefán Karl Stefánsson played the character in Dr. Seuss' How the Grinch Stole Christmas! The Musical from 2008 until 2015. The Grinch also appeared as a cameo in Mad, being voiced by Stephen Stanton.

He also appeared as a cameo in Robot Chicken, voiced by the series creator Seth Green. In Universal Pictures and Illumination's feature shortened to The Grinch directed by Scott Mosier and Yarrow Cheney, he was voiced by Dr. Strange's actor Benedict Cumberbatch, as well as commercials and short films that Cumberbatch also voiced the Grinch in promoting the 2018 film. In the Grinch's third live-action feature, Dr. Seuss' The Grinch Musical Live!, he was played by Matthew Morrison.

 Boris Karloff (How the Grinch Stole Christmas!), (1966), (1994; archive recordings, uncredited)
 Hans Conried (Halloween Is Grinch Night), (1977)
 Bob Holt (The Grinch Grinches the Cat in the Hat), (1982)
 Dan Castellaneta (Parody in Tiny Toon Adventures), (1992)
 Walter Matthau (Random House Home Video), (1992)
 Anthony Asbury (The Wubbulous World of Dr. Seuss), (1996-1998)
 Wally Wingert (Family Guy), (1999)
 Corey Burton (Sneech Beach Area, Seuss Landing Street Show), (1999)
 Jim Carrey (How the Grinch Stole Christmas), (2000)
 Josh Gerhardt (The Grinch), (2000)
 Rik Mayall (The Dr Seuss Collection, audio CD) (2000)
 Stefán Karl Stefánsson (Dr. Seuss' How the Grinch Stole Christmas!), (2008-2015)
 Stephen Stanton (Mad), (2010)
 Seth Green (Robot Chicken), (2010, 2012, 2013)
 Benedict Cumberbatch (The Grinch), (2018)
 Matthew Morrison (Dr. Seuss' The Grinch Musical Live!), (2020)
 David Howard Thornton (The Mean One), (2022)

In popular culture
The Grinch has become an anti-icon of Christmas and the winter holidays, as a symbol of those who despise the holiday, much in the same nature as the earlier character of Ebenezer Scrooge. Over the years, the Grinch has appeared on various forms of memorabilia such as Christmas ornaments, plush dolls, and various clothing items. The grumpy, anti-holiday spirit of the character has led to the everyday term "Grinch" coming to refer to a person opposed to Christmas time celebrations or to someone with a coarse, greedy attitude. In 2002, TV Guide ranked The Grinch number 5 on its "50 Greatest Cartoon Characters of All Time" list.

He also made a brief appearance on the television in Home Alone and Home Alone 2: Lost in New York.

The Grumple, from The Simpsons, is a green monster who is an obvious parody of the Grinch.

In The Fairly Oddparents episode, "Merry Wishmas", Timmy Turner, Santa Claus, and the elves watch in the television "How the Grump Stole Wishmas", a parody of the Grinch.

In the early hours of Christmas Eve 2018, a group of climbers put a giant Santa hat on Antony Gormley's colossal Angel of the North statue (20 metres; 66' high, wingspan 54 metres; 177') near Gateshead, north England. They had attempted to do this, unsuccessfully, for several Christmases. In the early hours of December 29, the pranksters returned, one of them dressed as the Grinch and the others as Santa Claus, and the Grinch "stole" Santa's hat.

References

External links

 All about The Grinch on Chuck Jones Official Website.
 
 Grinch at Don Markstein's Toonopedia. Archived from the original on February 5, 2016.

Villains in animated television series
Christmas characters
Dr. Seuss characters
Fantasy film characters
Literary characters introduced in 1957
Male characters in film
Male characters in literature
Fictional hermits
Fictional humanoids
Fictional thieves
Male film villains
Male literary villains
The Grinch (franchise)
Male characters in animation